This is a list of public and private libraries in Barcelona (Catalonia, Spain).

Public libraries owned by the Diputació de Barcelona

Public libraries belonging to other institutions

Privately owned libraries

Libraries in the metropolitan area

Cornellà de Llobregat

L'Hospitalet de Llobregat

See also
 List of libraries in Spain
 Culture in Barcelona
 List of markets in Barcelona
 List of theatres and concert halls in Barcelona
 List of museums in Barcelona
 Books in Spain
 Open access in Spain to scholarly communication

References

External links
 Diputació de Barcelona. Servei de biblioteques.
 Libraries of Barcelona official website.

Culture in Barcelona

Education in Barcelona
Libraries
Libraries in Barcelona
Libraries, Barcelona